The 1991 All-Ireland Senior Club Camogie Championship for the leading clubs in the women's team field sport of camogie was won by Mullagh from Galway, who defeated surprise contenders Eglishfrom (Tyrone in the final, played at Ballinasloe.

Arrangements
The championship was organised on the traditional provincial system used in Gaelic Games since the 1880s, with Glen Rovers and Celtic winning the championships of the other two provinces. There were two shock results in the semi-final as Mullagh defeated Glen Rovers with a winning point from Emer Hardiman Eglish celebrated the 25th anniversary of the founding of their club when they defeated Celtic from Dublin. Emer Hardiman scored three goals for Mullagh in the final. Eglish had defeated Loughgiel Shamrocks in the Ulster final by 3-7 to 2-4.

The Final
Emer Hardiman’s three goals for Mullagh in as they led by 2–11 to 0–0.

Final stages

References

External links
 Camogie Association

1991 in camogie
1991
Cam